Monty Python's Flying Circus is a British surreal sketch comedy series created by and starring Graham Chapman, John Cleese, Eric Idle, Terry Jones, Michael Palin and Terry Gilliam, who became known as "Monty Python", for BBC1. The series stands out for its use of absurd situations, mixed with risqué and innuendo-laden humour, sight gags and observational sketches without punchlines. Live action segments were broken up with animations by Gilliam, often merging with the live action to form segues. It premiered on 5 October 1969 and ended on 5 December 1974, with a total of 45 episodes over the course of 4 series.

Series overview

Episodes

Series 1 (1969–70)

Series 2 (1970)

Series 3 (1972–73)
In this series only, the opening sequence begins with a nude organist (played by Jones), Cleese saying 'and now', and the 'It's' Man.

Series 4 (1974)
Cleese did not return for the final series. The series was broadcast under the simple banner Monty Python (although the old full title, Monty Python's Flying Circus, is displayed at the beginning of the opening sequence). Cleese did receive writing credits on some episodes that featured material he had written for the first draft of Monty Python and the Holy Grail (particularly in "Michael Ellis").

References

External links
 
 
 "The complete unexpurgated scripts of the original TV series" at www.ibras.dk

.Episodes
Monty Python's Flying Circus